John Patrick Cotter (March 2, 1911 – March 16, 1993) was a justice of the Connecticut Supreme Court from 1965 to 1981, serving as chief justice from 1978 to 1981.

Early life, education, and career
Born in Hartford, Connecticut, Cotter was a truck driver during the Great Depression, receiving a B.S. in history and economics from Trinity College in 1933, and a J.D. from Harvard Law School in 1936. He entered the practice of law with the Hartford firm of Day, Berry and Howard until 1938, when he opened his own practice. In 1941, he became prosecuting attorney of the Hartford Police Court.

He served in the Connecticut House of Representatives from 1947 to 1950, where he was the House Democratic floor leader.

Judicial career
In 1950, Governor Chester Bowles appointed Cotter to the Court of Common Pleas, and in 1955 Governor Abraham Ribicoff elevated him to the Superior Court, where Cotter bristled at the tendency of lawyers to continually seek to put off scheduled trials due to lack of preparation.

In 1965, Cotter was appointed to the Connecticut Supreme Court, where he was initially a frequent dissenter. As the composition of the court became more liberal, Cotter's dissents became majority opinions. As Chief Justice of Connecticut, Cotter oversaw the consolidation of the state's disorganized court system into its current structure.

Personal life
Cotter and his wife Jeanette had a son and two daughters. In 1989, Cotter's son, John P. Cotter Jr., carried out the murder–suicide of his wife and children, and himself.

Cotter died in a nursing home in Bloomfield, Connecticut at the age of 82.

References

1911 births
1993 deaths
People from Hartford, Connecticut
Trinity College (Connecticut) alumni
Harvard Law School alumni
Members of the Connecticut House of Representatives
Justices of the Connecticut Supreme Court
20th-century American politicians
20th-century American judges